The flag of the Maakhir de facto autonomous region of Somalia was originally established with the declaration of the first Maakhir government, though with the emergency in Maakhir in early 2008, President Jibrell Ali Salad called for a new government to better address the needs of Maakhiris.  A new flag was then proposed for Maakhir, which was adopted. Maakhir was dissolved in 2009.

See also
Flag of Somalia

Maakhir
Puntland
Maakhir
Flags introduced in 2008